Wedlock may refer to: 
 Marriage
 Wedlock (film), directed by Lewis Teague
 Wedlock (album), an album by Sunburned Hand of the Man
 Billy Wedlock, English footballer
 Fred Wedlock, English folk singer
 Wedlock, a 2009 historical book written by Wendy Moore
 Wedlock, a web-comic from Scott Kurtz